, is a Japanese mixed martial artist. He competed in the Bantamweight and Featherweight divisions. He is known for his judo and shoot wrestling expertise.

Mixed martial arts career
On August 23, 1998, Toida participated in the lightweight tournament of the 5th All Japan Amateur Shooto Championship. He lost to Kazuhiro Inoue in the final and became the runner-up. He would make his professional debut on September 18, 1998, against Naoya Uematsu and lost via armbar. 

On December 16, 2001, he faced Alexandre Franca Nogueira for the Shooto Lightweight (-65kg) Championship and failed to win the title after losing a 0-3 decision.

In May 2003, he lost to Baret Yoshida in the first round of the ADCC World Championship under 66kg weight class.

Toida fought Rumina Sato in the semifinals of the 2005 Shooto Pacific Rim Lightweight Championship tournament, losing by KO with a right hook.

Toida fought Kazunori Yokota at the DEEP Cage Impact 2011 in Tokyo, losing by TKO after a soccer kick and ground and pound in the 2nd round.

On April 26, 2013, he fought Seiji Akao at DEEP 62 IMPACT and lost by decision (0-3). After the match, he announced his retirement in the ring.

Championships and accomplishments
Shooto
All Japan Amateur Shooto Championship Lightweight Runner-up (1998)
Submission wrestling
All Japan Combat Wrestling Championship MVP (2002)

Mixed martial arts record

|-
| Loss
| align=center| 13-13-3 (1)
| Seiji Akao
| Decision (unanimous)
| Deep: 62 Impact
| 
| align=center| 2
| align=center| 5:00
| Tokyo, Japan
| 
|-
| Win
| align=center| 13-12-3 (1)
| Hiroyuki Kobayashi
| Decision (unanimous)
| Deep: Cage Impact 2012 in Tokyo: 1st Round
| 
| align=center| 2
| align=center| 5:00
| Tokyo, Japan
| 
|-
| Loss
| align=center| 12-12-3 (1)
| Makoto Kamaya
| TKO (punches)
| Deep: 57 Impact
| 
| align=center| 1
| align=center| 1:13
| Tokyo, Japan
| 
|-
| Loss
| align=center| 12-11-3 (1)
| Kazunori Yokota
| TKO (soccer kicks and punches)
| Deep: Cage Impact 2011 in Tokyo, 1st Round
| 
| align=center| 2
| align=center| 0:25
| Tokyo, Japan
| 
|-
| Loss
| align=center| 12-10-3 (1)
| Issei Tamura
| KO (punches)
| Shooto: Gig Tokyo 7
| 
| align=center| 1
| align=center| 1:23
| Tokyo, Japan
| 
|-
| NC
| align=center| 12-9-3 (1)
| Shigeki Osawa
| NC (accidental kicks to the groin)
| World Victory Road Presents: Sengoku Raiden Championships 13
| 
| align=center| 3
| align=center| 1:35
| Tokyo, Japan
| 
|-
| Win
| align=center| 12-9-3
| Yusuke Yachi
| DQ (illegal upkick)
| Shooto: The Way of Shooto 2: Like a Tiger, Like a Dragon
| 
| align=center| 1
| align=center| 3:45
| Tokyo, Japan
| 
|-
| Win
| align=center| 11-9-3
| Wataru Takahashi
| Submission (rear-naked choke)
| GCM: Cage Force 14
| 
| align=center| 2
| align=center| 0:28
| Tokyo, Japan
| 
|-
| Loss
| align=center| 10-9-3
| Tetsu Suzuki
| TKO (punches)
| GCM: Cage Force 7
| 
| align=center| 1
| align=center| 0:16
| Tokyo, Japan
| 
|-
| Loss
| align=center| 10-8-3
| Hatsu Hioki
| Submission (armbar)
| Shooto: Back To Our Roots 7
| 
| align=center| 2
| align=center| 4:30
| Tokyo, Japan
| 
|-
| Loss
| align=center| 10-7-3
| Takeshi Inoue
| Decision (unanimous)
| Shooto: Back To Our Roots 6
| 
| align=center| 3
| align=center| 5:00
| Tokyo, Japan
| 
|-
| Win
| align=center| 10-6-3
| Gustavo Franca
| Decision (unanimous)
| Heat: Heat 4
| 
| align=center| 3
| align=center| 5:00
| Nagoya, Aichi, Japan
| 
|-
| Draw
| align=center| 9-6-3
| Adrian Pang
| Draw
| WR 9: Warriors Realm 9
| 
| align=center| 3
| align=center| 5:00
| Australia
| 
|-
| Draw
| align=center| 9-6-2
| Tenkei Oda
| Draw
| Shooto: 11/10 in Korakuen Hall
| 
| align=center| 3
| align=center| 5:00
| Tokyo, Japan
| 
|-
| Loss
| align=center| 9-6-1
| Atsushi Yamamoto
| Decision (unanimous)
| K-1: Hero's 3
| 
| align=center| 2
| align=center| 5:00
| Tokyo, Japan
| 
|-
| Win
| align=center| 9-5-1
| Makoto Ishikawa
| Submission (rear naked choke)
| Shooto 2005: 7/30 in Korakuen Hall
| 
| align=center| 2
| align=center| 4:09
| Tokyo, Japan
| 
|-
| Draw
| align=center| 8-5-1
| Atsushi Yamamoto
| Draw
| GCM: D.O.G. 1
| 
| align=center| 3
| align=center| 5:00
| Tokyo, Japan
| 
|-
| Loss
| align=center| 8-5
| Rumina Sato
| KO (punch)
| Shooto: Year End Show 2004
| 
| align=center| 2
| align=center| 1:21
| Tokyo, Japan
| 
|-
| Win
| align=center| 8-4
| Jin Kazeta
| Submission (armbar)
| Shooto 2004: 4/16 in Kitazawa Town Hall
| 
| align=center| 2
| align=center| 4:19
| Setagaya, Tokyo, Japan
| 
|-
| Loss
| align=center| 7-4
| Naoya Uematsu
| Submission (achilles lock)
| Shooto: Wanna Shooto 2003
| 
| align=center| 1
| align=center| 4:06
| Tokyo, Japan
| 
|-
| Win
| align=center| 7-3
| Rami Boukai
| Decision (majority)
| Shooto: 1/24 in Korakuen Hall
| 
| align=center| 2
| align=center| 5:00
| Tokyo, Japan
| 
|-
| Loss
| align=center| 6-3
| Alexandre Franca Nogueira
| Decision (unanimous)
| Shooto: To The Top Final Act
| 
| align=center| 3
| align=center| 5:00
| Urayasu, Chiba, Japan
| 
|-
| Win
| align=center| 6-2
| Baret Yoshida
| Decision (majority)
| Shooto: To The Top 6
| 
| align=center| 3
| align=center| 5:00
| Tokyo, Japan
| 
|-
| Win
| align=center| 5-2
| Osmar Diaz Fernandez
| Technical Submission (armbar)
| Shooto: To The Top 4
| 
| align=center| 1
| align=center| 0:37
| Tokyo, Japan
| 
|-
| Win
| align=center| 4-2
| Hisao Ikeda
| Decision (unanimous)
| Shooto: To The Top 1
| 
| align=center| 3
| align=center| 5:00
| Tokyo, Japan
| 
|-
| Win
| align=center| 3-2
| Hiroshi Umemura
| Submission (armbar)
| Shooto: R.E.A.D. 12
| 
| align=center| 1
| align=center| 2:07
| Tokyo, Japan
| 
|-
| Win
| align=center| 2-2
| Takeru Ueno
| Decision (unanimous)
| Shooto: R.E.A.D. 7
| 
| align=center| 2
| align=center| 5:00
| Setagaya, Tokyo, Japan
| 
|-
| Loss
| align=center| 1-2
| Kazuhiro Inoue
| Decision (majority)
| Shooto: R.E.A.D. 5
| 
| align=center| 2
| align=center| 5:00
| Tokyo, Japan
| 
|-
| Win
| align=center| 1-1
| Tetsuo Katsuta
| Decision (unanimous)
| Shooto: Gig '99
| 
| align=center| 2
| align=center| 5:00
| Tokyo, Japan
| 
|-
| Loss
| align=center| 0-1
| Naoya Uematsu
| Submission (armbar)
| Shooto: Shooter's Dream
| 
| align=center| 1
| align=center| 2:46
| Setagaya, Tokyo, Japan
|

Submission grappling record
KO PUNCHES
|- style="text-align:center; background:#f0f0f0;"
| style="border-style:none none solid solid; "|Result
| style="border-style:none none solid solid; "|Opponent
| style="border-style:none none solid solid; "|Method
| style="border-style:none none solid solid; "|Event
| style="border-style:none none solid solid; "|Date
| style="border-style:none none solid solid; "|Round
| style="border-style:none none solid solid; "|Time
| style="border-style:none none solid solid; "|Notes
|-
|Loss|| Baret Yoshida || Sumission (rear naked choke) || Gi Grappling 2005|| 2004|| || ||
|-
|Draw|| Takumi Yano || Decision (unanimous) || CAND || 2004|| || ||
|-
|Loss|| Koji Komuro || Submission (sode guruma jime) || THE CONTENDERS 8 || 2003|| || ||
|-
|Loss|| Baret Yoshida || Decision (unanimous) || THE CONTENDERS Millennium-1 || 2001|| || ||
|-
|Win|| Takumi Yano || Decision (unanimous) || THE CONTENDERS Millennium-1 || 2001|| || ||
|-

See also
List of male mixed martial artists

References

External links
 
 
 

1977 births
Japanese male mixed martial artists
Bantamweight mixed martial artists
Featherweight mixed martial artists
Mixed martial artists utilizing judo
Japanese male judoka
Living people
20th-century Japanese people
21st-century Japanese people